Mirny is a rural locality (a settlement) in Kursky Selsoviet, Kulundinsky District, Altai Krai, Russia. The population was six as of 2013. There are two streets.

Geography 
Mirny is located 17 km southeast of Kulunda (the district's administrative centre) by road. Vinogradovka is the nearest rural locality.

References 

Rural localities in Kulundinsky District